Paradise and Hell is the left and right panels of a minor diptych by a follower of Hieronymus Bosch based on The Haywain Triptych. The image is oil on panel and is 135 x 45 cm. It was painted c. 1510 and is now in the Museo del Prado, Madrid. Paradise is depicted darker than in the Haywain, which possibly represents the darkness of original sin.

Description
The left panel depicts Creation and the Garden of Eden. It is loosely divided into sections, beginning at the top and ending at the bottom, while the right panel does not appear to follow any sequence of events. The left panel most likely corresponds with the Book of Genesis, and follows from the top, moving downward, and the right panel possibly corresponds with the Book of Revelation. At the top of the left panel, God sits enthroned in Heaven while the world is created. Angels toss the fallen angels out of the Heaven. While the fallen angels are thrown out of Heaven, they turn to insects. Moving downward, in the next 'section', a scene is shown where God has created Eve and is introducing her to Adam. In the third 'section', the serpent offers Adam and Eve a fruit from the Tree of Knowledge of Good and Evil, and Adam is reaching out to take it. At the bottom of the panel, an angel expels Adam and Eve from the Garden of Eden, thus marking the Fall of Man, and the two become ashamed of their nakedness. The right panel depicts the consequences of Adam and Eve's choice, in which a vision of hell is shown. A burning building can be seen in the background, and in the foreground, there appear to be several demons constructing a fortress or castle. To the lower left, a man is being directed towards a castle by two mutated animals. Just in front of the portcullis is a man riding a cow, being pierced by a sword or spear. At the bottom right, a man is running while being attacked by demonic creatures, while to the lower left a man is being devoured by a large human-legged fish.

References
Pioch, Nicolas. "Bosch, Hieronymus: Paradise and Hell". WebMuseum. October 14, 2002. Retrieved January 1, 2008

Paintings by Hieronymus Bosch in the Museo del Prado
Cultural depictions of Adam and Eve
Triptychs
Hell in popular culture
Angels in art
Cattle in art
Insects in art
Snakes in art